The Morals of the Alley is a 1925 German silent film directed by Jaap Speyer and starring Werner Krauss, Ernst Hofmann, and Mary Odette.

The film's sets were designed by the art director Franz Schroedter.

Cast

References

Bibliography

External links

1925 films
Films of the Weimar Republic
German silent feature films
Films directed by Jaap Speyer
German black-and-white films